Andrew Bruce Pasterfield,  (born 23 November 1989) is a Paralympic swimmer from Australia.

Swimming
Andrew Bruce Pasterfield competed in the 2010 IPC Swimming World Championships, held in Eindhoven, Netherlands where he won a gold medal in the men's 4 × 100 m freestyle relay event.

At the 2012 Summer Paralympics Pasterfield won a gold in the Men's 4 × 100 m Freestyle Relay 34 points, and three bronzes in the Men's 50 m Freestyle S10, 100 m Freestyle S10 and Men's 4 × 100 m Medley Relay 34 points. He also participated in the Men's 100 m Backstroke S10 and Men's 100 m Butterfly S10 events.

He was awarded an Order of Australia Medal in the 2014 Australia Day Honours "for service to sport as a Gold Medallist at the London 2012 Paralympic Games."

In 2016, he was awarded Speedo Services to the Australian Swim Team at the Swimming Australia Awards.

See also
 Australia at the Paralympics
 Disabled sports

References

Bibliography

External links

 
 

Male Paralympic swimmers of Australia
Swimmers at the 2012 Summer Paralympics
Swimmers at the 2010 Commonwealth Games
Living people
Paralympic bronze medalists for Australia
Paralympic gold medalists for Australia
1989 births
Recipients of the Medal of the Order of Australia
Commonwealth Games silver medallists for Australia
Medalists at the 2012 Summer Paralympics
Commonwealth Games medallists in swimming
S10-classified Paralympic swimmers
Medalists at the World Para Swimming Championships
Paralympic medalists in swimming
Australian male freestyle swimmers
Australian male backstroke swimmers
21st-century Australian people
Medallists at the 2010 Commonwealth Games